A European Union-wide banking stress test exercise has been conducted by the Committee of European Banking Supervisors every year since 2009. The second instance was performed in July 2010. The Council of the European Union (in its economic and financial – ECOFIN – configuration) mandated that Committee so to do, in the aftermath of the global financial crisis which started in 2007.

Summary of 2010 results by bank
The 2010 test was the second of its kind, which assesses the financial strength of European banks under different adverse scenarios. This was done in co-operation with the European Central Bank, the European Commission and the national supervisory authorities of the member states.

The 2010 results were released on 23 July 2010. Of the 90 banks tested, 7 failed the 6% tier 1 capital ratio threshold: five in Spain (Unnim, Diada, Espiga, Banca Cívica, and Cajasur), one in Germany (Hypo Real Estate), and one in Greece (ATEBank).

MEUR = million euros
 Assets = total risk-weighted assets
Benchmark = tier 1 ratio with benchmark scenario at 31 December 2011
Adverse = tier 1 ratio with adverse scenario at 31 December 2011
Shock = tier 1 ratio with additional sovereign shock on the adverse scenario at 31 December 2011
 Additional capital needed = additional capital needed to reach 6% tier 1 ratio under adverse scenario at 31 December 2011

See also
List of bank stress tests
European System of Financial Supervisors
Supervisory Capital Assessment Program, a similar exercise in the United States of America

References

External links
 CEBS press release on the stress tests
 Joint press release by the CEBS, the ECB, and the European Commission on the stress tests
 Summary report of the stress tests
 Results of the 2010 European Union banking stress test exercise
 OECD: The EU Stress Test and Sovereign Debt Exposures

Economy of the European Union
Great Recession in Europe
Stress tests (financial)

fi:Stressitesti